City Winery is a winery, restaurant, music venue and private event location in Hudson Square, New York City. Other locations include Atlanta, Chicago, Nashville, Boston, Washington D.C., and Philadelphia. Satellite locations are sited in Chicago and New York City. A location in Montgomery, New York, at former textile mill, the first one outside a major city, was also planned for 2018. A location at New York City's Grand Central Terminal was also leased in 2022.

Founded in 2008 by chief executive officer Michael Dorf, the venue has hosted gigs by Graham Nash, Norah Jones, Lee Ann Womack and Graham Parker. In mid-2021, John Mulaney performed a several-week-long stretch of stand-up shows at City Winery in New York City, Mulaney's first shows since leaving rehab in early 2021. It runs a set of free early evening weekday gigs for local musicians. Each City Winery location is a fully functioning urban winery, importing grapes from all over the world to create unique locally made wines.

Shlomo Lipetz, also a member of Team Israel at the World Baseball Classic in March 2017, serves as the vice president of programming, and books music for their five locations. Lipetz began working at City Winery in 2008 with its founding.

References

Wineries in New York (state)
2008 establishments in New York City
Music venues in Manhattan
Drinking establishments in Manhattan
Hudson Square